
Martin Spanberg (d. 1761; , Martyn Petrovich Shpanberg) was a Danish naval officer in Russian service who took part with his compatriot Vitus Bering in both Kamchatka expeditions as second in command. He is best known for finding a sea route to Japan from Russian territory and for exploring the Kuril Islands. Shikotan, one of the Kurils, was renamed in his honor by the Russians in 1796.

Spanberg led three voyages in 1738, 1739, and 1742. He charted 30 of the Kurils. On the second voyage, he gained a fourth shipthe Bolsheretskand was the first Russian commander to visit Honshu in Japan, establishing Russo-Japanese diplomatic relations. His ships landed in a scenic area now part of the Rikuchu Kaigan National Park but, despite isolationist Japanese sakoku policy of the time, the sailors were treated with courtesy. The second and third voyages also surveyed the coasts of Japan and Sakhalin as well as the Kurils.

Works
Spanberg wrote a brief account of his travels. They pointedly failed to locate the phantom islands of Rica de Oro and Rica de Plata ("Rich in Gold and Silver") supposedly in the area. The first trustworthy account of the region, Spanberg further established that the supposedly enormous Staten Island (lit. "States Island") and Company Land common on European maps after the 1743 visit of Maarten Gerritsz Vries of the Dutch East India Company were either nonexistant or much smaller in extent, grossly misrepresenting some of the Kurils like Urup and Iturup. It was not, however, immediately accepted and the various phantom islands continued to appear on French and other maps for decades longer.

Honors
Shpanberg Island in the Kurils and Shpanberg Island in the Nordenskiöld Archipelago are named for him.

See also 
 Vitus Bering, Dembei, Gerasim Izmailov, Ivan Fyodorov
 Great Northern Expedition

References

Citations

Bibliography
 .
 .

1761 deaths
Explorers from the Russian Empire
Danish explorers
Explorers of Asia
18th-century Danish people
Imperial Russian Navy personnel
Great Northern Expedition
Year of birth unknown
Russian people of Danish descent